Scutomyia is a subgenus of Aedes.

Species  
Aedes albolineatus 
Aedes arboricolus 
Aedes bambusicolus 
Aedes boharti 
Aedes hoogstraali 
Aedes impatibilis 
Aedes laffooni 
Aedes platylepidus 
Aedes pseudoalbolineatus

References 

Aedes
Insect subgenera